Mongolia has seen a construction boom starting in 2007. Ulaanbaatar is seeing new highrises at least  in height.
  
The 'High rise building code' and 'Seismic design building code' recommended restrictions on the construction of 17 to 35 story-tall high rise buildings (i.e. buildings  in height). The  'Seismic design building code' recommended restrict 4-16 story-tall mid and low rise buildings (i.e. buildings  in height.)

Completed

Under construction

Proposed

Tallest structures

References

Tallest
Mongolia
Mongolia